is a Japanese former women's racing cyclist. Born in the northern island of Hokkaido, she originally trained to be a speed skater, but switched to cycling when she was 22. She won the first Japanese National Road Race Championships for women held in 1998, a title she ended up winning eleven straight times. From 2002, she became the first Japanese to participate on the women's pro tour in Europe, riding for French, Italian, and Dutch teams. She won the Trophée des Grimpeurs in 2002. She represented Japan at the 2000, 2004, and 2008 Summer Olympics. She retired in 2008 and currently serves as an adviser for women's keirin.

References

External links

1974 births
Living people
Japanese female cyclists
Cyclists at the 2000 Summer Olympics
Cyclists at the 2004 Summer Olympics
Cyclists at the 2008 Summer Olympics
Olympic cyclists of Japan
Cyclists at the 1998 Asian Games
Cyclists at the 2002 Asian Games
Cyclists at the 2006 Asian Games
Asian Games competitors for Japan
20th-century Japanese women
21st-century Japanese women